Jordan Jones (born December 12, 1995) is an American professional soccer player.

Career

Youth and College
Jones played four years of college soccer at Oregon State University between 2014 and 2017. During his time with the Beavers, Jones was named Second Team All-Pac-12 Conference. All-Pac-12 Conference Academic Honorable Mention, All-Pac-12 Conference Academic Honorable Mention, USC Third Team All-Far West Region, and Second Team All-Pac-12 Conference.

Jones also played for Premier Development League sides Portland Timbers U23s and Lane United.

Professional
On January 21, 2018, Jones was selected 47th overall in the 2018 MLS SuperDraft by Los Angeles FC.

Jones signed with United Soccer League side Rio Grande Valley FC on March 16, 2018. He made his professional debut the same day as a half-time substitute in a 1–1 draw with Saint Louis FC.

References

External links

Oregon State Beavers bio

1995 births
Living people
American soccer players
Association football forwards
FC Tucson players
Lane United FC players
Los Angeles FC draft picks
Oregon State Beavers men's soccer players
People from Pacific Grove, California
Portland Timbers U23s players
Rio Grande Valley FC Toros players
Soccer players from California
USL Championship players
USL League Two players
USL League One players